Ammakilikkoodu is a 2003 Malayalam film starring Prithviraj Sukumaran and Navya Nair. Directorial debut of M. Padmakumar, written by Ranjith.

Plot
Vivek takes a job as the manager of karunalayam, a retirement house. He meets a young woman called Akhila, who had sent her stepfather to jail for abusing her mentally ill mother, and they fall in love. Karunalayalam is financially in a bad state and the owner wants to sell it off, but Vivek tries his best to save the retirement house, since the residents have nowhere else to go. Eraadi is the owner of Karunalayam. Akhila's father is Siddharthan who was poor thereby marrying Akhila's mother for money and her properties as her mother was from a very family. As Akhila's grandfather died suddenly Siddharthan learned that Akhila's grandfather did not gave any share of properties to Akhila's mother, siddharthan then leaves them. Akhila's uncle comes to Karunlayam to take Akhila and her mother to the tharavad (ancestral home). Vivek is saddened when Akhila leaves from karunalayam, one of the mothers in karunalayam asks him whether he loves Akhila to which he replies that he is not so lucky. Vivek plans to sell his kidney for 5 lakhs for saving the karunalayam home. Eraadi learns about this, and feels sympathy for Vivek so Eraadi gives all his properties to Vivek. At last Akhila and her mother go to karunalayam with two surprises for Vivek; one is to give a blank cheque to Vivek for keeping the mothers safe in Karunalayam and second is to fix the date for engagement of Akhila and Vivek.

Cast

Prithviraj Sukumaran as Vivek 
Navya Nair as Akhila
Mukesh as Collector Mohan Paul
Sai Kumar as Siddharth
Vijayaraghavan as Rajan
Innocent as Eradi
Saritha as Janaki
Kaviyoor Ponnamma as Marykutty Teacher
Jagathy Sreekumar as Arnose
K. P. A. C. Lalitha as Saraswathy Amma
Sukumari as Parvathy Ammal
Mallika Sukumaran as Saramma
Madhupal as Company Manager
Mamukkoya as Pareekutty
Vijayakumari as Kousalya
Santha Devi as Lakshmi
Santhakumari 
Anil Murali
V. K. Sreeraman as Priest
Unni Sivapal 
Sreehari as SI
Kozhikode Sharada as Kumari
Meena Ganesh

References

External links
 

2000s Malayalam-language films
2003 romantic drama films
Films scored by Raveendran
2003 films
Films directed by M. Padmakumar
Indian romantic drama films